Wingate is an unincorporated community in Dorchester County, Maryland, United States. Wingate is located along Wingate Bishops Head Road northeast of the Honga River in the southern part of the county.

References

Unincorporated communities in Dorchester County, Maryland
Unincorporated communities in Maryland
Maryland populated places on the Chesapeake Bay